Local elections took place in Pasay on May 9, 2022 within the Philippine general election. The voters elected for the elective local posts in the city: the mayor, vice mayor, the congressman, and the councilors, six of them in the two districts of the city.

Background
Mayor Imelda "Emi" Calixto-Rubiano ran for her second term. Her running mate was Waldetrudes "Ding" Del Rosario, the daughter of Vice Mayor Boyet Del Rosario.

Former First District Councilor and defeated 2019 vice mayoral candidate Richard Advincula also ran. His running mate was Former City Administrator Ernestina "Tina" Bernabe-Carbajal.

Former Manila Chief Prosecutor Edward Togonon ran for mayoralty for the second time. His running mate was Hector Bongat, who previously ran as councilor of Second District.

Rep. Antonino "Tony" Calixto ran for a second term. His opponents were Efren Alas (Team ABA), Ramon Yabut (Team Leni) and Jocelyn Sato (Tropang Togonon).

Candidates

Administration coalition

Opposition coalitions

Other coalitions/candidates

Opinion polling

For mayor

For vice mayor

For congressional lone district

Results 
Names written in bold-Italic are the re-elected incumbents while in italic are incumbents lost in elections.

For Representative 
Rep. Tony Calixto defeated his closest rivals Efren Alas and Ramon Yabut.

For Mayor 
Mayor Emi Calixto-Rubiano defeated former Councilor Richard Advincula and retired Chief Prosecutor Edward Togonon.

For Vice Mayor 
Waldetrudes "Ding" Del Rosario, daughter of Vice Mayor Noel "Boyet" Del Rosario, defeated her closest rival, former Councilor and City Administrator Ernestina "Tina" Bernabe-Carbajal in a huge margin.

For Councilors

First District 
The entire slate of Team Calixto were re-elected.

|-bgcolor=black
|colspan=5|

Second District 
Three of the six incumbents were re-elected. Three-termer councilors Allan Panaligan, Arnel Regino Arceo, and Aileen Padua-La Torre were replaced by Jennifer "Jen" Panaligan, Angelo Nicol "Allo" Arceo, and Zengelbert "Zeng" La Torre respectively.

Five out of six candidates of Team Calixto won, where three of them are re-elected incumbents. All of them won, with the exception of Zengelbert "Zeng Padua" La Torre, wife of outgoing Councilor Aileen Padua-La Torre. He fell short and placed 7th. King Marlon "Khen" Magat who previously ran as councilor in the same district last elections, now placed 5th. Allan Panaligan was replaced by her wife, former 2010 councilor candidate Jennifer Panaligan while Arnel Regino "Moti" Arceo was replaced by his son, Angelo Nicol "Allo" Arceo. 

Former Councilor Noel "Onie" Bayona failed to made comeback in the city council, placing 9th.

Ma. Czarina Lou Tolentino, wife of former Acting Vice Mayor and Second District Councilor Arvin "Bong" Tolentino also failed to win a seat, placing 8th

|-bgcolor=black
|colspan=5|

References

2022 Philippine local elections
Elections in Pasay
May 2022 events in the Philippines
2022 elections in Metro Manila